Worting is a former village and now a district of Basingstoke, Hampshire, that was formed around 1970 as part of the Basingstoke Town Centre Development Plan. The area is bounded to the south by Hatch Warren and the Worting Junction. To the east is the district of Brighton Hill and the Cranbourne area.

Villages in Hampshire
Areas of Basingstoke